Well depth may refer to:

Depth in a well, a measurement of location in oil and gas drilling and  production
The charge capacity of each pixel in a charge-coupled device